Jozef Luknár (15 January 1915 – 13 May 1966) was a Slovak footballer and manager who played as a forward and appeared for both the Czechoslovakia and Slovakia national teams.

Career
Luknár earned his first and only cap for Czechoslovakia on 3 April 1938 in the 1936–38 Central European International Cup against Switzerland, which finished as a 0–4 loss in Basel. He later represented the Slovakia national team, making his first appearance in the team's inaugural on 27 August 1939 in a friendly against Germany. Luknár scored the second goal of the match, which finished as a 2–0 win in Bratislava. He was capped nine times in total for Slovakia and scored four goals, making his final appearance on 9 April 1944 in a friendly match against Croatia, which finished as a 2–7 loss in Zagreb.

Personal life
Luknár was born in Ivanka pri Dunaji on 15 January 1915, and was nicknamed Hammer. He died on 13 May 1966 while coaching a training session in Modra at the age of 51.

Career statistics

International

International goals

References

External links
 
 
 

1915 births
1966 deaths
People from Senec District
Sportspeople from the Bratislava Region
Czechoslovak footballers
Czechoslovakia international footballers
Slovak footballers
Slovakia international footballers
Dual internationalists (football)
Association football forwards
ŠK Slovan Bratislava players
SK Olomouc ASO players
Czechoslovak First League players
Czechoslovak football managers
Slovak football managers
Association football player-managers
SK Olomouc ASO managers